Claudine Punipuao Toleafoa (born 28 February 1970) is a former professional tennis player from New Zealand.

Biography

Early years
Toleafoa was born in Auckland and is of Samoan heritage, with her father Afamasaga Fa'amatala coming from Fasito'o Tai on the island of Upolu. Her mother, Phillipa Lousley, is from Dunedin. As a child she lived for a time in Samoa and represented the country in tennis at the 1985 South Pacific Mini Games.

During her junior career she made the girls' doubles quarter-finals at both the 1987 and 1988 US Open competitions.

Tennis career
Toleafoa began playing for the New Zealand Federation Cup team in 1989 and won her debut match over Italy's world number 25 Sandra Cecchini, 10–8 in the third set, to help the side win the World Group tie.

On the WTA Tour her best results came at her home tournament, the Wellington Classic. In 1990 she beat two seeded players, Donna Faber and Sandra Wasserman, to reach the semi-finals, then in 1991 made the quarter-finals, beating third seed Larisa Neiland en route. In addition to her singles performances at Wellington she also twice made the semi-finals of the doubles.

She appeared in the main singles draw of the 1991 Australian Open and made the second round, defeating Stephanie Rottier, which resulted in her career best ranking of 121 following the tournament. At the 1991 French Open she fell in the qualifying draw, then lost in the final round of qualifying at the 1991 Wimbledon Championships, but received entry into the main draw as a lucky loser. She lost in the opening round of Wimbledon to Julie Halard, in three sets.

In 1992 she played Steffi Graf in a Federation Cup tie, then from 1993 until her retirement in 1996 only came up against opponents from the Asia/Oceania Zone, as New Zealand had dropped out of the World Group. She finished her Federation Cup career with a 17/16 overall record, from 25 ties.

Personal life
Toleafoa is married to Australian former professional tennis player Carl Limberger.

She now works in Auckland as a lawyer and was previously a prosecutor for NZ Police.

ITF finals

Singles (0-3)

Doubles (3-3)

References

External links
 
 
 

1970 births
Living people
New Zealand female tennis players
New Zealand sportspeople of Samoan descent
Tennis players from Auckland
New Zealand women lawyers
21st-century New Zealand lawyers